Sven Alfred Thörne (24 April 1850, Horn - 15 March 1916, Stockholm) was a Swedish landscape painter.

Biography
His father, Sven Petter Thörne, was a cobbler. From 1874 to 1880, he studied at the Royal Swedish Academy of Fine Arts with Per Daniel Holm. The year he graduated, he was awarded a royal medal for one of his landscapes. In 1884, he received scholarship that enabled him to make a study trip to Germany, France, Italy and Belgium. He returned to Sweden in 1886 and, in 1891, married Matilda Josefina Wahlberg.

He and Olof Hermelin held a joint exhibition in Stockholm in 1910. A memorial exhibition at the Konstnärshuset took place shortly after his death. 

His favorite areas for landscapes were Mälardalen, Dalarna and Bergslagen. he occasionally worked as a drawing teacher. 

References

External links 

 Biography from the Nordisk familjebok @ Projekt Runeberg
 More works by Thörne @ ArtNet
Biographical notes @ the Lexikonett Amanda

1850 births
1916 deaths
Swedish painters
Swedish landscape painters
People from Kinda Municipality